Sing Mother Goose is a 1945 picture book with music by Opal Wheeler and illustrated by Marjorie Torrey. The book contains a collection of Mother Goose Nursery rhymes set to music. The book was a recipient of a 1946 Caldecott Honor for its illustrations.

References

1945 children's books
American picture books
Caldecott Honor-winning works